Melanoplus gladstoni, known generally as the Gladston's spur-throat grasshopper or Gladston grasshopper, is a species of spur-throated grasshopper in the family Acrididae. It is found in North America.

References

Melanoplinae
Articles created by Qbugbot
Insects described in 1897